Thomas Quentin Wren, Jr., known as Tommy Wren (born August 4, 1976), is a Democratic former member of the Arkansas House of Representatives. He  represented District 62 from 2013 to 2015; from 2011 to 2013, he was assigned to District 71.

Wren was unseated, 54-46 percent, in the November 4, 2014 general election by the Republican Michelle Gray of Melbourne. The district includes Izard, Independence, Sharp, and Stone counties.

Wren is affiliated with the American Farm Bureau Federation.

References

1976 births
Living people
Democratic Party members of the Arkansas House of Representatives
University of Central Arkansas alumni